John Henry Hudson (born July 6, 1966) is a retired American professional basketball player. He was a 2.05m (6'8 ") tall power forward.

College career
Born in Anderson, South Carolina, Hudson played college basketball at San Jacinto Junior College, and at the University of South Carolina.

Professional career
In 1990, Hudson signed with Panionios of the Greek Basket League. He also played with Pagrati, Bnei Herzliya, Peiraikos, Olympique Antibes, Sporting, and Eltizur Ashkelon. In 1991, he won the Greek Cup title, while playing with Panionios, and in 1995, he won the Israeli State Cup, while playing with Bnei Herzliya. He was also a Greek Cup semifinalist in 1993, while playing with Pagrati, and an Israeli State Cup finalist in 1996, while playing with Bnei Herzliya.

Hudson won the first Greek All-Star Game Slam Dunk Contest on December 28, 1991, where he broke the basketball backboard during the contest.

References

External links
Greek League statistics (1996-1999) at baskethotel.com
European Cup statistics at FIBA Europe
University of South Carolina statistics at Sports Reference

1966 births
Living people
American expatriate basketball people in France
American expatriate basketball people in Greece
American expatriate basketball people in Israel
American men's basketball players
Basketball players from South Carolina
Bnei Hertzeliya basketball players
Centers (basketball)
Olympique Antibes basketball players
Pagrati B.C. players
Panionios B.C. players
Peiraikos Syndesmos B.C. players
Power forwards (basketball)
San Jacinto Central Ravens men's basketball players
South Carolina Gamecocks men's basketball players
Sporting basketball players